Methylenecyclohexane (IUPAC name: methylidenecyclohexane) is an organic compound with the molecular formula C7H12.

Synthesis 
It can be produced by a Wittig reaction or a reaction with a Tebbe's reagent from cyclohexanone. It can also be synthesized as a side product of the dehydration of 2-methylcyclohexanol into 1-methylcyclohexene.

Structure 
Methylenecyclohexane is an unsaturated hydrocarbon, containing a cyclohexane ring with a methylene (methylidine) group attached.

See also 
 Methylcyclohexane
 Methylenecyclopropane

References 

Vinylidene compounds
Hydrocarbons